Appearance may refer to:

 Visual appearance, the way in which objects reflect and transmit light
 Human physical appearance, what someone looks like
 Appearances (film), a 1921 film directed by Donald Crisp

 Appearance (philosophy), or phenomenon
 Phantasiai, a term in ancient Greek philosophy variously translated as "appearances," "impressions," "presentations," and "representations."
 Appearance (law), the coming into court of either of the parties to a suit, and/or the formal act by which a defendant submits himself to the jurisdiction of the court.

Appear or Appears may refer to:
 "Appears", a song released by Ayumi Hamasaki in 1999

Appearing may refer to:
Appearing (media consultants) - "Appearing", broadcast media promotion consultants, a PR agency headed by Scott Piering

See also

 
 
 Apparition (disambiguation), any instance of appearing, but usually referring to a supernatural phenomenon
 Cap (sport) in some sports is a metaphorical term for a player's appearance on a select team, such as a national team